Navia affinis is a species of plant in the genus Navia. This species is native to Venezuela.

References

Flora of Venezuela
Affinis